Poticaw Bayou is a stream in the U.S. state of Mississippi. It is a tributary to the West Pascagoula River.

Poticaw is a name derived from the Choctaw language purported to mean "double". Variant names are "Bayou Portico", "Portico Bayo", "Portigo Bayou".

References

Rivers of Mississippi
Rivers of Jackson County, Mississippi
Mississippi placenames of Native American origin